James Robert Lynch (August 28, 1945 – July 21, 2022) was an American football linebacker. Lynch played college football for the Notre Dame Fighting Irish, where he was named an All-American and won the Maxwell Award in 1966. Lynch is a member of the College Football Hall of Fame.

Lynch went on to play for the Kansas City Chiefs of the American Football League (AFL) and National Football League (NFL) for 11 seasons. He was an AFL All-Star in 1968 and a member of the Super Bowl IV championship team.

Early life
Lynch was born in Lima, Ohio. He graduated from Lima Central Catholic High School in 1963. Lynch played for the football and basketball teams.

College career
Lynch played college football at the University of Notre Dame. Leading the Fighting Irish in tackles with 108 in 1965 and 106 in 1966, he was the defensive captain of the national champion 1966 Irish team. He received the Maxwell Award as the nation's best college football player in 1966. He was also a unanimous All-American selection that year.

Professional career
The Kansas City Chiefs selected Lynch in the second round of the 1967 NFL/AFL draft. From 1967 to 1977, Lynch played for the Chiefs as a right outside linebacker, playing alongside middle linebacker Willie Lanier and left outside linebacker Bobby Bell, both Pro Football Hall of Famers. These linebackers were important elements in the Chiefs' defense in their 1969 championship season, and led the defense in the Chiefs' first Super Bowl victory three years later in their first AFL-NFL World Championship (Super Bowl IV).

Retiring at the end of the 1977 season, Lynch finished his career with 18 sacks, 17 interceptions and 14 fumble recoveries. He also scored one touchdown.

Honors
Lynch was selected to play in the 1968 AFL All-Star Game.

In 1988, Lynch was inducted as an inaugural member into the Lima Central Catholic Hall of Fame for athletic achievement. In 1990, Lynch was inducted into the Chiefs' Hall of Fame. He was inducted into the College Football Hall of Fame in 1992. In 2006, Lynch was interviewed for the NFL Network documentary America's Game: The Super Bowl Champions chronicling the 1969 Kansas City Chiefs AFL and World Championship season.

Personal life
Lynch and his wife had three children. His older brother, Tom, was a center and captain for the 1963 Navy football team.

Lynch died on July 21, 2022, at the age of 76.

Explanatory notes

References

External links
 
 

1945 births
2022 deaths
All-American college football players
American Football League All-Star players
American Football League players
American football linebackers
College Football Hall of Fame inductees
Kansas City Chiefs players
Maxwell Award winners
Notre Dame Fighting Irish football players
Players of American football from Ohio
Sportspeople from Lima, Ohio